Herbert Theodore "Buttons" Briggs (July 8, 1875 – February 18, 1911) was an American Major League Baseball pitcher who played a total of five seasons.

Career
Born in Poughkeepsie, New York, Briggs played his entire major league career for the Chicago National League franchise. He finished his career with 44 wins and 47 losses and a 3.41 ERA.

Later life
Around 1910, Briggs contracted pneumonia but was able to return to work as a decorator in Cleveland. In January 1911, a newspaper account described him as "down and out with lung trouble." He died of tuberculosis at his Cleveland home in June 1911. His friends in Cleveland had scheduled a benefit for him, which was held a few days after he died. He is interred at the Calvary Cemetery there.

References

External links

1875 births
1911 deaths
Baseball players from New York (state)
Major League Baseball pitchers
19th-century baseball players
Chicago Colts players
Chicago Orphans players
Chicago Cubs players
Sportspeople from Poughkeepsie, New York
Little Rock Travelers players
Grand Rapids Rippers players
Grand Rapids Gold Bugs players
Columbus Buckeyes (minor league) players
Columbus Senators players
Grand Rapids Furnituremakers players
Cortland Wagonmakers players
Sioux City Cornhuskers players
Utica Pentups players
Toronto Maple Leafs (International League) players
Indianapolis Indians players
20th-century deaths from tuberculosis
Tuberculosis deaths in Ohio